A house dish is a very large wooden dish, often ornately carved and painted in various human or animal figures, used in First Nations ceremonies in British Columbia. House dishes may be reserved only for special foodstuffs and not used for more common fare.

Serving and dining
First Nations culture
Indigenous cuisine in Canada
Indigenous art in Canada